The Bellamy Historic District, in Franklin County, Georgia near Carnesville, Georgia, is located on GA 51, approximately 2.75 mi. NW of junction with I-85.  It is a  historic district which was listed on the National Register of Historic Places in 1996.  The listing included 14 contributing buildings.

It includes double pen architecture and Queen Anne architecture.

References

Historic districts on the National Register of Historic Places in Georgia (U.S. state)
National Register of Historic Places in Franklin County, Georgia
Queen Anne architecture in Georgia (U.S. state)